The 2008–09 Japan Figure Skating Championships were the 77th edition of the event. It took place between December 25 and 27, 2008 at the Big Hat arena in Nagano. Skaters competed in the disciplines of men's singles, ladies' singles, pair skating, and ice dancing on the senior level for the title of national champion of Japan. In addition, the event will also be used to choose the Japanese teams to the 2009 World Championships and the 2009 Four Continents Championships. The Japanese team to the 2009 World Junior Championships was chosen at the Japanese Junior Championships.

Competition notes
 The following skaters placed high enough at Junior Nationals and so were invited to compete at Senior Nationals: Yuzuru Hanyu (1st in junior), Tatsuki Machida (2nd in junior), Daisuke Murakami (3rd in junior) and Kento Nakamura (4th in junior) for the men; Haruka Imai (1st in junior), Mari Suzuki (2nd in junior), Kanako Murakami (3rd in junior), and Ayane Nakamura (4th in junior) for the ladies; and Nana Sugiki / Taiyo Mizutani (1st in junior) in ice dancing.

Results

Men

Ladies

Pairs

Ice dancing

Japan Junior Figure Skating Championships
The 2008–09 Japan Junior Figure Skating Championships were the Japanese National Championships for the Junior level for the 2008–09 season. They took place in Nagoya from November 23 through 24, 2008. The results of this competition were used to choose the Japanese team to the 2009 World Junior Championships.

The following skaters placed high enough at Novice Nationals and so were invited to compete at Junior Nationals: Sei Kawahara (1st in novice, 11th in junior) and Hiroaki Sato (2nd in novice, 27th in junior) for the men; and Miu Sato (1st in novice, 25th in junior), Mao Watanabe (2nd in novice, 30th in junior), Karen Kemanai (3rd in novice, 7th in junior), and Risa Shoji (4th in novice, 29th in junior) for the ladies.

Men

Ladies

Ice dancing

International team selections
Following the Japanese Championships, the team to the 2009 World Championships, 2009 Four Continents Championships, 2009 Winter Universiade were announced as:

World Championships

Four Continents Championships

Winter Universiade

World Junior Championships
Following the Japanese Junior Championships, the team to the 2009 World Junior Championships was announced as:

References

External links
 2008–09 Japan Figure Skating Championships results
 2008–09 Japan Junior Figure Skating Championships results
 2008–09 Japan Novice Figure Skating Championships results 

Japan Figure Skating Championships
2009 in figure skating
2008 in figure skating
Figure skating